The following is a list of events affecting Philippine television in 2014. Events listed include television show debuts, finales, cancellations, and channel launches, closures and rebrandings, as well as information about controversies and carriage disputes.

Events

January
 January 1 – ABS-CBN officially launches a new logo thru the year-long campaign Masayang Muli Ang Kwento Natin.
 January 16 – After 17 years of broadcast, Studio 23 ended its commercial operations on Thursday evening.
 January 18 – ABS-CBN's new UHF sports channel on Channel 23, S+A, was officially launched.
 January 22 – Vhong Navarro was beaten by Cedric Lee and five other men in a condominium unit after he was allegedly caught in the act of raping Deniece Cornejo, the occupant of the said condominium unit. Navarro aired his side on the said incident in an interview by Boy Abunda for his program, Buzz ng Bayan, on January 26. Last April 26, Lee together with his companion Simeon Raz was arrested by the NBI agents in Oras, Eastern Samar, 1 week after the Taguig RTC issued warrants of arrests for the serious illegal detention case. On May 5, Cornejo surrendered to the authorities at the Philippine National Police headquarters in Camp Crame.

February
 February 1 – April Mariz Epey Herher won the hearts of judges, host and audience of the program It's Showtime after she named as the first That's My Tomboy grand winner on It's Showtime, a segment dedicated to lesbians.
 February 7
 People's Television Network, in partnership with HBKOR, Inc., announced that it will launch a talent search called K-Pop Idol Search (KIS) – Pinoy Edition. Preliminaries were held April to August 2014. The winner of the said competition will win two million pesos, a six-month intensive training in South Korea, and a five-year exclusive performing contract.
 14 people died, including 2 foreigners and comedian Tado Jimenez, after a Florida bus with 45 passengers on-board fell into a 500-meter deep ravine in Bontoc, Mountain Province. 24 others were reported injured, while four more passengers were reported missing.
 February 8 – Wally Bayola made a tearful return as one of the hosts of Eat Bulaga! after a 5-month hiatus due to a sex video scandal.
 February 14
 The revived local version of MTV in the country, MTV Pinoy was relaunched. Sam Pinto, Andre Paras, singer Josh Padilla, and Yassi Pressman were also introduced as the channel's VJs.
 Manila Clasico Game 7 PBA semi-finals match between Barangay Ginebra San Miguel and San Mig Super Coffee Mixers garnered the top spot as the most-watched primetime television program in Metro Manila by AGB Nielsen Philippines with a record-breaking 32% audience share in MEGATAM.
 February 20 – The 10th USTv Students' Choice Awards. ABS-CBN, and its programs and media personalities received 16 awards; GMA Network, including its free news television channel GMA News TV, received 9 awards; while TV5 received 1 award.
 February 24 – Bandila, a late night news program broadcast by ABS-CBN, reported that two persons from Pangasinan were reported to have a flesh-eating disease and their disease is highly communicable. By February 25, the Department of Health (DOH) confirmed that the mysterious flesh-eating disease affecting two persons in the province of Pangasinan was a hoax. DOH also clarified that the two individuals were in fact affected by leprosy, and a severe case of psoriasis. The news created fear among the public. It also became a hot topic online as the mysterious disease was said to be part of a prophecy by a self-titled Indian prophet Vincent Selvakumar of the Voice of Jesus Ministries who visited the country last April 2013. Julius Babao, one of the anchors of the news program, later clarified on February 25 that it was not their intention to ignite fear among the public. He further added, It is not the program's intention to scare the public but to report the information we gathered so that authorities would give appropriate action. On February 27, ABS-CBN issued an official statement that was broadcast on the same program apologizing for the fear and panic caused by the report that was broadcast on February 24. The network also added that their internal ombudsman office will look into the false report, and will take appropriate actions based on the findings of the network's ombudsman. On February 28, the provincial government of Pangasinan demanded for an apology from ABS-CBN. The provincial government said that the false news report had greatly damaged the province's tourism sector.
 February 26 – ABS-CBN was the most awarded television network after receiving nine awards in the 49th Anvil Awards by the Public Relations Society of the Philippines (PRSP). GMA Network's Dapat Tama electoral advocacy campaign also received an award in the said event.

March
 March 7 – GMA Network and ABS-CBN earned 11 and 5 nominations respectively in the 2014 New York Festivals International Television and Film Awards. The awards ceremony was held last April 8 (April 9; Philippine time) in Las Vegas, Nevada, United States.
 March 8 – Tearful Vhong Navarro returned to It's Showtime for more than a month of hiatus after recovering from injuries sustained following a mauling incident by six men in a condominium unit at The Fort, Taguig on January 22.
 March 19 – TV5 news anchor Erwin Tulfo and GMA Super Radyo DZBB 594 commentator Carmelo del Prado Magdurulan were named by the Philippine Daily Inquirer as among the beneficiaries of the diversion of congressional allocations from the Priority Development Assistance Fund (PDAF) which was coursed through the National Agribusiness Corporation (Nabcor) in 2009. Both media men were reported to have received P245,535. Due to this, TV5 and GMA Network separately announced that they will be probing their respective broadcasters involved in the said allegations.
 March 21 – GMA Network dominated the 5th Golden Screen Awards organized by the Entertainment Press Society as it bags the Outstanding TV Network award together with 27 other awards. ABS-CBN got home 24 awards while TV5 bagged away 2 awards.
 March 22
A. Montes I Elementary School from Iloilo City emerged as Junior Pinoy Henyo Sayawan Grand Champion held at the Newport Performing Arts Theater, Resorts World Manila on Eat Bulaga. They were coached by Yuri Villanueva.
Haydee Mañosca emerged as Stars on 45 champion on It's Showtime.
 March 23 – GMA Network launched their own version of the Hollywood Walk of Fame called the "GMA Walk of Fame". Over 196 personalities and talents of the Kapuso Network both from the Entertainment and News and Public Affairs divisions had their own star at the Walk of Fame located at the network's compound in EDSA, Quezon City.
 March 29 – Kapatid TV5 International renewed their contract with OSN, a pay TV network based in the Middle East and North Africa. Kapatid TV5 was named as the second top-rated Filipino international channel by OSN.
 March 30 – ABS-CBN formally launched this year's Station ID for the summer season called "Masayang Muli ang Kwento ng Summer" featuring the travel destinations, the culture and the smile of every Filipino. Kathryn Bernardo and Daniel Padilla rendered the song "PINASmile" which has been used for the station ID.

April
 April 5 – Kapt. Jose Cardones Memorial Elementary School from Taguig City emerged as Junior Pinoy Henyo Pautakan grand champion on Eat Bulaga.
 April 7 – Discovery Channel's Manhunt series, starring ex-US Navy SEAL Joel Lambert, will feature the forest of Subic Bay Freeport Zone, Olongapo City. Lambert will try to trek around the Subic tropical forest while evading capture by Philippine Scout Rangers.
 April 9
 GMA Network's daily docu-reality program Tunay Na Buhay episode entitled Sanggol at Langaw won the gold medal at the 2014 New York Festivals International TV and Film Awards. Six other GMA programs and plugs, and two ABS-CBN programs bagged the silver and bronze medals, respectively.
 Filipina models Katarina Rodriguez and Jodilly Pendre were named as the second and first runner-up of the Asia's Next Top Model (cycle 2) finale which was aired on Star World. Malaysian aspirant Sheena Liam was hailed as the winner of the said reality modelling competition. The show was also aired on TV5 in a delayed telecast.
 April 23 – Department of Social Welfare and Development Secretary Dinky Soliman accused News5, TV5's news division, of manipulating information of their unkempt DSWD warehouse (currently used for the World Food Programme) with rotten and spoiled relief goods in Brgy. Calibaan, Tacloban City. The report was aired last March 26 on Pilipinas News, the network's late night newscast. In an official statement, TV5 stands for its story on the incident.
 April 26 – Bryan Castillo was named as the grand winner of the reality show The Biggest Loser Pinoy Edition: Doubles aired on ABS-CBN. Bryan, known as the Pride of Pembo, Makati and the member of Team MagKapatid now weighs in at 139 pounds from the former 293 pounds with a weight loss percentage of 52.56%. Kayen Lazaro, Francis Asis and Osie Nebreja were named as the 1st, 2nd and 3rd runner up, respectively.
 April 29 – ABS-CBN (both for television and radio, and the Manila and Regional Network Group stations) won major awards at the 22nd KBP Golden Dove Awards with 22 awards including Best TV station and the KBP Lifetime Achievement Award given to the network's chairman, Eugenio Lopez III. TV5 only got 2 awards for Pinoy Explorer (Best TV Magazine Program) and Ogie Alcasid of Tropa Mo Ko Unli (Best Comedy Actor). Pampanga-based TV network CLTV-36 was awarded for the second time as the Best Provincial TV station.

May
 May 5
 Documentarist Howie Severino named as the Vice President for Professional Development of GMA News after he resigning as the VP for Multimedia Journalism of GMA Network and the editor-in-chief of GMA News Online. Severino will keep his job as the host of I-Witness and anchor of News to Go.
 GMA Network chairman and CEO Atty. Felipe L. Gozon confirms the network stockholders is in negotiations with San Miguel Corporation chairman Ramon Ang who is interested to buy the equity stake of the network.
 May 8–10 – Advertising and Marketing companies will joined together for the staging of the first AD Summit Pilipinas 2014 with the theme, entitled Age of Enlightenment, and the Kidlat Awards that will recognized the achievements of advertising industry in 2013. The convention was held at the Subic Bay Exhibition and Convention Center in Subic, Zambales. TV5, RMN, MBC and ABS-CBN are the major sponsors of the said event to be organized by Accredited Advertising Agencies of the Philippines and Advertising Suppliers Association of the Philippines.
 May 10 – Baguio-based John Raspado, formerly one of the wildcard contestants of the contest was hailed as the grand winner of I Am Pogay segment of the noontime show It's Showtime aired on ABS-CBN, the contest on TV for gay men.
 May 18 – News personalities Mike Enriquez, Luchi Cruz-Valdes, and Korina Sanchez both denied their links in to the Pork Barrel scam controversy of Janet Lim Napoles.
 May 19 – GMA News's special coverage (consisting of 24 Oras, State of the Nation with Jessica Soho, Saksi, 24 Oras Weekend and Kapuso Mo, Jessica Soho) of the aftermath of Typhoon Yolanda that hit several parts of the Visayas region last November 2013 to be awarded as one of the 46 winners of the George's Foster Peabody Awards to be held in New York City. This is the fourth time that a Philippine TV network was recognized by the Peabody Awards. I-Witness documentaries Kidneys for Sale (2000), Kamao (2000) and Ambulansya de Paa (2009), Brigada Siete feature on Child Labor (2000) and Reel Time's Salat (2013) were former recipients of the award.
 May 22 – GMA Network won the Outstanding TV Station of the year of the 34th Rotary Club of Manila Journalism Awards.
 May 30 – ABS-CBN (Gold Services Company of the Year Award) and its president and CEO Charo Santos-Concio (Woman of the Year for the Philippines) emerged as the lone Philippine winner of the Asia-Pacific Stevie Awards held at South Korea.

June
 June 1 – The premiere telecast of It Takes Gutz to be A Gutierrez, the first reality TV show based on the one of the prominent showbiz families in the country, the Gutierrezes aired on E! Channel Asia. In the pilot episode of the Mike Carandang-directed program, Richard Gutierrez confirms that his partner Sarah Lahbati gave birth to a baby boy named Zion.
 June 2
 Asian Television Content Corporation (ATC) started their blocktime agreement for Intercontinental Broadcasting Corporation (IBC Channel 13), fifth time for the network (with former blocktime deals from Vintage, Viva, Makisig (discontinued and not aired) and AKTV). ATC will supply quality alternative programming for the government-sequestred TV network.
 In line with their 40th anniversary in the television industry, People's Television Network Channel 4's newscasts (Balitaan, PTV NewsBreak, News @ 1, News @ 6, NewsLife, The Weekend News) will be reformatted with new titlecards, new graphic designs and a brand new studio set design by Extremity Arts.
 June 4 – For the fourth straight time, GMA Network's First Vice President for News Programs and State of the Nation anchor Jessica Soho was recognized as the Most Trusted News Presenter in the Philippines by Reader's Digest Asia.
 June 11 – The Movie and Television Review and Classification Board ordered ABS-CBN to attend a mandatory conference on the gender sensitivity issues for their reality show Pinoy Big Brother: All In. The Philippine Commission on Women condemned the June 4 episode on the nude painting task given for 4 housemates of the program, Jayme Jalandoni, Ranty Portento, Daniel Matsunaga and Michele Gumabao. Jayme, Ranty and Michele was part of the evictees from the reality show.
 June 13 – ABS-CBN won the Award of Excellence at recent IABC's International Gold Quill Awards 2014 for their advocacy of the restoration of Philippine classic films. The awards were held in Toronto, Ontario, Canada.
 June 14
Veteran actress Boots Anson-Roa tied the knot once again, now together with his new fiancé Atty. King Rodrigo in a wedding ceremony led by Arch. Luis Antonio Cardinal Tagle at the Archbishop's Palace in Manila.
Nhikzy Vheench Calma (Mini Michael Jackson) emerged as MiniMe Grand Winner.
 June 16 – Brigada's Gintong Burak episode won the One World Award, the highest recognition of the USIFVF for the Philippine television. That said episode, together with Wagas, both from GMA News TV, was awarded the Gold Camera Award in the 2014 US International Film & Video Festival, GMA News and Public Affairs, likewise won five silver screen awards and one certificate of excellence awards. ABS-CBN also got 2 awards.
 June 18 – StarStruck batch 5 alumnus Steven Silva and Save Me Hollywood vocalist/I Am Meg Season 1 winner Julz Savard will become the cast members of The Boston, the second season of The Kitchen Musical. Some of the scenes of the drama will be shot in Manila. The show will be aired on Lifestyle and will be also aired internationally.
 June 22 – MTRCB praised Fox International Channels, the cable TV channels group and distributor of the hit American TV series The Walking Dead on their self-regulation by airing warnings during the show. MTRCB chairman Toto Villareal, together with the board members and FIC VP Jude Turcuato attended the meeting at the FIC headquarters in Taguig City.
 June 24 – GMA Network, through a group of stockholders, the Duavit, Jimenez and the Gozon families have decided to sell their minority equity interest in the company's outstanding capital stock to San Miguel Corporation president Ramon S. Ang.
 June 25–26 – UNTV 37  celebrated its first decade on the air. The TV station pioneered free public service programs to the public and the use of its rescue team and UV drones is backed by Daniel Razon, popularly known as Kuya Daniel or as Mr. Public Service.
 June 25 – TV5 presents to the advertisers their newest programming line-up for the 3rd quarter in 2014 during the Signal No. 5: Umuulan ng Saya trade launch at the Manila Polo Club.
 June 26 – Mayor Herbert Bautista, Architect Bong Recio, PBC Pres. Atom Henares and UNTV-BMPI CEO Daniel Razon led groundbreaking of the soon-to-rise 18-storey UNTV Broadcast Center located a few meters away from the current UNTV building in EDSA Philam Homes, Quezon City. The building will be completed in January 2016.

July
 July 1 – Veteran journalist Jessica Soho has retired from her post as the first vice president for news programs for GMA News. Soho will keep her job as the host of Kapuso Mo, Jessica Soho and anchor of State of the Nation with Jessica Soho.
 July 9 – Game 5 of the 2014 PBA Governor's Cup Finals between Grand slam champions San Mig Coffee Mixers and Rain or Shine Elasto Painters gained an average of 4 million viewers or 9.5 percent AMR and 34 percent audience share in the National Urban TV Audience Measurement (NUTAM) in the primetime slot, based on Nielsen Media Research.
 July 12 – Christian Broadcasting Network Asia and ABS-CBN signed a contract to air the bible-based animated series Superbook on the Yes Weekend! morning line-up. Christian Broadcasting Network Asia President Peter Kairuz and ABS-CBN Head of TV Production Cory Vidanes graced the contract signing.
 July 14 – The Boycott Sofitel and "No To Sofitel" campaign was launched by the supporters of UNTV and Daniel Razon due to intentional delisting of the channel in their hotel cable line-up, among other reasons.
 July 19 – Ilocana beauty Chatterlie Mae Umalos was crowned the first ever grand finals winner of Gandang Babae 2014 during a live episode of It's Showtime.
 July 27
 Team Sarah Lyca Gairanod won the first season of The Voice Kids after their successful finale at the Resorts World Manila.
 TV5 news anchor Paolo Bediones was the latest victim of a sex video scandal with an unknown woman spreading thru social media and became a trending topic on Twitter.
 July 28 – PTV 4 and IBC 13 employees staged their protest at the Commonwealth Avenue in time for the PNoy's State of the Nation Address.
 July 30 – Eat Bulaga!, the Philippines longest running noontime show, celebrated its 35th year on Philippine Television.

August
 August 9 – Celebrity couple Dingdong Dantes and Marian Rivera was engaged after their marriage proposal during the live telecast birthday special of Marian aired on GMA Network. Their wedding will be set on December 30, 2014, in the Immaculate Conception Cathedral in Cubao, Quezon City.
 August 23 – 9TV is the network was launched.
 August 24 – Brazilian-Japanese model and actor Daniel Matsunaga was chosen by the voting public to become the Big Winner of Pinoy Big Brother: All In in the Big Night held at the Resorts World Manila and aired on ABS-CBN. Matsunaga won P1M cash and other prizes including Asian Trip for 2 and a condo unit. Maris Racal, Jane Oineza and Vickie Rushton were named as the 2nd, 3rd and 4th placers respectively.
 August 29 
 ABS-CBN bagged another Stevie award for Company of the Year – Media & Entertainment, the third Stevie award bagged by ABS-CBN for 2014.
 Sharon Cuneta ends her 2-year contract with TV5. Her last program with the network was Madam Chairman which ended last January.
 August 30 – Ricardo Marcial emerged as Stars on 45 Volume 2 champion on It's Showtime.

September
 September 1 – Jack City was no longer aired on BEAM Channel 31 as BEAM prepares for the ISDB-T digital television. However, Jack City continues to broadcast on cable networks. After its closure, it aired O Shopping and TBN which its started from 9:00 am of the date mentioned above.
 September 3 – Sec. Sonny Coloma in the hearing for the 2015 PCOO Senate budget and GCG Adisclosed that efforts to privatize IBC-13 will continue next year despite legal obstacles. Escudero suggest to Congress to allocate subsidy for unpaid GSIS, SSS, PhilHealth contributions of the network employees.
 September 7 
 Billy Crawford was arrested after his drunk behavior at the Taguig Police Station 7, happened hours after the Star Magic Ball when Crawford was the guest. Billy was apologized to the police and the fans. The following day, Crawford post bail on his Malicious Mischief case.
 September 25 – Richard Yap and Jodi Sta. Maria officially announced in their press conference that ABS-CBN's morning drama Be Careful with My Heart will officially end on November 28 after their successful 2-year run.

October
 October 1 – TV Patrol Weekend's coverage on the onslaught of Typhoon Yolanda was recognized as the nominee for the News category of the 2014 International Emmy Awards.
 October 4 – Liana Ella Kuzma hailed as FHHM 2014 Grand Winner.
 October 12 – Valerie Weigmann was declared the winner of Miss World Philippines 2014, crowned by outgoing titleholder and current Miss World, Megan Young at the Mall of Asia Arena. She will be competing on December 14 in London for the Miss World 2014 crown.
 October 14 – ABS-CBN scored yet another Stevie award for People's Choice Stevie Award for Media & Entertainment, the fourth Stevie award bagged by ABS-CBN in 2014.
October 18 – Nikko Seagal Natividad was crowned the first ever grand finals winner of Gandang Lalake: Kuma-Career during a live episode of It's Showtime.
October 25 – Team Jugs, Teddy and Billy hailed as the fifth anniversary champion on It's Showtime.
October 23 - The Fastbreak 2014 At The Mall Of Asia Arena

November
 November 10 – As part of GMA News shakeup, Vicky Morales joined the 24 Oras team as its third anchor. Also, GMA Regional newscasts for Bicol, Cebu, Davao, Northern Mindanao, Iloilo, Dagupan and Ilocos adopted the 24 Oras branding. Along with Saksi (which Pia Arcangel replaced Morales on her stint) and Balitanghali (which Connie Sison replaces Arcangel on her stint), the graphic package went flat, also their title cards, the return of the Myriad font for 24 Oras, and the OBB, along with its energetic theme music.
 November 20
More than 200 talents of GMA Network, members of the Talents Association of GMA filed a complaint against the network following the network's stand for refusal for them to become regular employees even the Project Employment Contract with benefits deal will present to them.
 November 23 – ABS-CBN dominated 32 categories, including Best TV Station, in the recently concluded 28th PMPC Star Awards for TV 2014 held at the Solaire Resort and Casino.
 November 27 - The Fastbreak 2014 Closing Ceremony At Philsports Arena

December
 December 13 – Neil Never Exit in Life was hailed as the Ultimate Talentado in Talentadong Pinoy Season 4.
 December 20 – Albay's Majestic Tala Parol from Oas, Albay emerged as TV Parol Grand Winner on It's Showtime.
 December 30 – Kapuso power couple Marian Rivera and Dingdong Dantes are now married in a Wedding ceremony at the Immaculate Conception Cathedral in Cubao, Quezon City. President Benigno Aquino III, Ogie Alcasid, German Moreno, Vic Sotto and GMA Network CEO chairman Atty. Felipe L. Gozon also attended the wedding.

Debuts

ABS-CBN

The following are programs that debuted on ABS-CBN:

GMA

The following are programs that debuted on GMA Network:

TV5

The following are programs that debuted on TV5:

Other channels
The following are programs that debuted on other minor channels:

Returning or renamed programs
The following are returning programs on free-to-air and local cable channels:

Major networks

Other channels

Programs transferring networks
The following are programs that have changed networks:

Major networks

Other channels

Milestone episodes
The following shows made their Milestone episodes in 2014:

Finales

ABS-CBN

The following are programs that ended on ABS-CBN:

Stopped airing
 March 7: Metal Fight Beyblade: Baku (cancelled), Digimon Xros Wars (cancelled) and Yu-Gi-Oh! Duel Monsters (reruns)
 April 11: Yu-Gi-Oh! 5D's (season 1) (reruns)
 August 29: The Singing Bee

GMA

The following are programs that ended on GMA Network:

TV5

The following are programs that ended on TV5:

Stopped airing
 February 21: Likeable or Not (reason: series break)
 June 7: SpinNation (season 2) (reason: series break)

Other channels
{{columns-list|colwidth=30em|
 January 2: Pangarap na Bituin on Jeepney TV
 January 3: Rated Korina on DZMM TeleRadyo
 January 10: Studio 23 Presents on Studio 23 (now S+A)
 January 10: The Office (season 4) on Fox Channel Philippines
 January 11: Sabong TV, Asenso Pinoy, Sel-J Motocross TV, Pinoy T.A.L.K. and gtion RX on Studio 23 (now S+A)
 January 11: Brand X with Russell Brand on Jack TV
 January 12: The Word Exposed with Luis Antonio Cardinal Tagle, Family Rosary Crusade, Friends Again, Agribusiness: How It Works, Sagupaan TV, ABS-CBN Sports presents Top Rank Boxing, Gag U and FPJ: Ang Nag-Iisang Alamat on Studio 23 (now S+A)
 January 13: NCIS: Los Angeles (season 3) on Studio 23 (now S+A)
 January 14: Missing on Studio 23 (now S+A)
 January 15: America's Next Great Restaurant on TGC
 January 15: Once Upon a Time and The Ultimate Fighter on Studio 23 (now S+A)
 January 16: Iba-Balita, Bilis Balita, Myx, Off the Map,  LBO: Lunch Box Office, Barkada Nights, Jeepney TV Tawa-Way Zone, Back at the Barnyard, Wonder Pets, Looney Tunes, Scandal, Revenge and O Shopping on Studio 23 (now S+A)
 January 16: The Biggest Loser: Pay It Forward on TGC
 January 19: Familia Zaragoza on Jeepney TV
 January 21: Bakekang on Fox Filipino
 January 22: My Name is Kim Sam Soon on TeleAsia Filipino
 January 25: Power Rangers Samurai on Hero
 January 25: Baki the Grappler on TeleAsia Filipino
 January 28: What's for Dinner? on TeleAsia Filipino
 January 31: Gintama (season 1) on Hero
 January 31: Cheer Up on Love on TeleAsia Filipino
 January 31: Moonlight on Fox Channel Philippines
 February 1: Marvel Knights on S+A
 February 1: Silver Surfer on S+A
 February 3: Driven to Extremes on S+A
 February 3: The Carrie Diaries (season 2) on ETC
 February 4: Powerhouse on GMA News TV
 February 5: GT Academy on S+A
 February 5: Yu-Gi-Oh! Zexal on Hero 
 February 6: The Tonight Show with Jay Leno on My Movie Channel
 February 7: Supa Strikas on S+A
 February 7: Ravenswood on ETC
 February 7: High Kick! on TeleAsia Filipino
 February 8: Front Row on GMA News TV
 February 8: The Best of Anderson Live on Solar News Channel
 February 9: Sports Pilipinas on GMA News TV
 February 9: SEA Games Myanmar 2013 Sinag Pilipinas on S+A
 February 10: American Horror Story: Coven on Jack TV
 February 12: Fashbook on GMA News TV
 February 14: Love Hotline on GMA News TV
 February 15: Follow The Star and Balita Pilipinas Primetime on GMA News TV
 February 16: CHInoyTV on Net 25
 February 17: The Office (season 5) on Fox Channel Philippines
 February 21: Gagambino on Fox Filipino
 February 23: Biyahero on PTV 4
 February 24: Mega Fashion Crew: Reloaded on ETC
 February 25: Louie (season 2) on Jack TV
 February 26: Super Fun Night on ETC
 February 27: Joey (season 1) on Fox Channel Philippines
 March 1: Power Rangers Super Samurai on Hero
 March 6: Tanging Yaman on Jeepney TV
 March 9: Tabing Ilog on Jeepney TV
 March 9: Avengers Assemble on S+A
 March 9: J League Highlights on S+A
 March 9: Sunday TV Mass: The Healing Eucharist (simulcast) on S+A
 March 9: Asian Tour Highlights on S+A
 March 10: Freedom Riders Asia and NXT on S+A
 March 12: WWE Superstars on S+A
 March 13: WWE Tough Enough on S+A
 March 14: Ang TV on Jeepney TV
 March 14: WWE Raw on S+A
 March 14: Gov @ Work on PTV/IBC
 March 17: Rockman.EXE Stream on TeleAsia Filipino
 March 19: Hitman Reborn! (season 3) on Hero
 March 19: Queen of Reversals on TeleAsia Filipino
 March 20: Digimon Adventure on Hero
 March 21: Triumph of Love on Telenovela Channel
 March 21: The Office (season 6) on Fox Channel Philippines
 March 23: Philippine Book of Records on GMA News TV
 March 23: Pop MYX The Crazy Late Night Show (season 2) on Myx and Solar News Channel
 March 24: Shaider on TeleAsia Filipino
 March 26: Pretty Little Liars (season 4) on ETC
 March 27: Top Chef Masters (season 4) on TGC
 March 27: Sons of Anarchy (season 5) on Jack City
 March 28: Glamorosa on Fox Filipino
 March 28: Rubi on Jeepney TV
 March 28: Joey (season 2) and White Collar (season 3) on Fox Channel Philippines
 April 3: How I Met Your Mother (season 9) on 2nd Avenue
 April 4: Gameday with Boom on Balls
 April 4: Gintama (season 4) on Hero
 April 4: TRiBE: Tayo Ito! on Net 25
 April 5: Kaya Mo Bang!: The Fudgee Barr Adventures (season 1) on ABS-CBN Sports+Action
 April 5: Boarding Pass on GMA News TV
 April 5: The Prince of Tennis on TeleAsia Filipino
 April 5: Fringe (season 4) on Jack City
 April 6: Sa Sandaling Kailangan Mo Ako on Jeepney TV
 April 9: Asia's Next Top Model (cycle 2) on Star World
 April 10: Iisa Pa Lamang on Jeepney TV
 April 11: Class7 Civil Servant on Net 25
 April 14: Ang Tanging Ina on Jeepney TV
 April 16: Love You a Thousand Times on TeleAsia Filipino
 April 17: Magkaribal on Jeepney TV
 April 19: Something to Chew On (season 1) on Solar News Channel
 April 20: What I See (season 2) on Solar News Channel
 April 21: Merlin (season 4) on Jack TV
 April 22: Ironside on Jack City
 April 22: The Crazy Ones on 2nd Avenue
 April 22: Gokusen on TeleAsia Filipino
 April 23: Suits (season 3) on Jack TV
 April 24: Naruto Shippuden (season 5) on Hero
 April 24: Bubble Gang Classics and Comedy Bar on Fox Filipino
 April 24: The Office (season 7) on Fox Channel Philippines
 April 25: The Middle (season 4) on 2nd Avenue
 April 25: Super Inggo on Jeepney TV
 April 26: Agrikultura ETC on PTV 4
 April 26: Power Rangers Jungle Fury on Hero
 April 28: Kuroko's Basketball (season 1) on Hero
 April 30: Kitchen Millionaire on TGC
 May 3: Digimon Tamers on Hero
 May 3: Tonyong Bayawak on Jeepney TV
 May 4: The Following (season 2) on Jack City
 May 6: America's Got Talent (season 7) on TGC
 May 8: Fushigi Yuugi and Pink Lipstick on TeleAsia Filipino
 May 8: Fat March on TGC
 May 9: Gintama (season 5) on Hero
 May 9: Meteor Garden on Jeepney TV
 May 10: Alphas (season 2) and The Tomorrow People on Jack TV
 May 12:  Gokusen II on TeleAsia Filipino
 May 12: Project Runway (season 11) on ETC
 May 12: Dollhouse (season 2) on Fox Channel Philippines
 May 14: Glee (season 5) on Jack TV/ETC
 May 14: New Girl (season 3) on ETC
 May 15: White Lies on TeleAsia Filipino
 May 15: Two and a Half Men (season 11) on Jack TV
 May 15: Chuck (season 5), One Tree Hill (season 3), The Finder and Without a Trace (season 3) on Fox Channel Philippines
 May 16: Almost Human, Ghost Whisperer (season 3), Cold Case (season 2) and Numb3rs (season 4) on Fox Channel Philippines
 May 16: Asian Treasures on Fox Filipino
 May 16: Star-Crossed on ETC
 May 17: The Big Bang Theory (season 7) on Jack TV
 May 17: The Originals (season 1) on ETC
 May 17: Kitchen Stories on GMA News TV
 May 19: Top Chef (season 9) on TGC
 May 19: Elementary (season 2) on Jack City
 May 19: House (season 3), Bones (season 7) and Lost (season 6) on Fox Channel Philippines
 May 20: Hitman Reborn! (season 4) on Hero
 May 20: Hart of Dixie (season 3) on 2nd Avenue
 May 20: The Vampire Diaries (season 5) on ETC
 May 20: 24 (season 6), Buffy the Vampire Slayer (season 5), Angel (season 2) and The Unit (season 2) on Fox Channel Philippines
 May 21: Smallville (season 5), Veronica Mars (season 1) and Lie to Me (season 2) on Fox Channel Philippines
 May 21: Bones (season 9) on Jack City
 May 22: American Idol (season 13) on ETC
 May 22: Those Who Kill on Jack City
 May 22: Survivor: Cagayan on Jack TV
 May 22: May Minamahal on Jeepney TV
 May 23: Princess Sarah (remake) on Jeepney TV
 May 25: The Simpsons (season 25), Family Guy (season 13) and American Dad (season 10) on Jack TV
 May 26: Grimm (season 3) on Jack TV/Jack City
 May 26: Balitang Middle East and Balitang Europe on ANC
 May 27: Richard Loves Lucy on Jeepney TV
 May 27: Gadget Boy on TeleAsia Filipino
 May 28: The Office (season 8) on Fox Channel Philippines
 May 28: Modern Family (season 5) on 2nd Avenue
 May 28: Friends with Better Lives on ETC
 May 28: Blood Lad on Hero
 May 28: Rasing Hope (season 4) on Jack TV
 May 29: Revolution (season 2) on Jack TV
 May 30: Psych (season 6) on Jack City
 May 30: Focus AEC on Net 25
 May 30: Solar Daybreak on Myx (only aired on Solar News Channel (now 9TV)
 June 1: The Score: Filoil Flying V Hanes Pre-Season Premier Cup Recap on S+A
 June 1: Bob's Burgers (season 4) on Jack TV
 June 1: Night After Night on TeleAsia Filipino
 June 1: News @ 1: Junior Edition on PTV
 June 3: Bakuman on TeleAsia Filipino
 June 5: Patayin Sa Sindak Si Barbara on Jeepney TV
 June 6: Gokusen III on TeleAsia Filipino
 June 6: All About Eve on Fox Filipino
 June 6: The League (season 3) on TGC
 June 6: Little Battlers eXperience on S+A
 June 6: Spider-Man Unlimited on S+A
 June 8: Road to Rio on S+A/Balls
 June 8: The Americans (season 2) on Jack City
 June 9: Zero Hour on S+A
 June 11: Digimon Adventure 02 on Hero
 June 11: Motive (season 1) on Jack City
 June 12: America's Next Top Model (cycle 13) on Lifestyle
 June 12: 2 Broke Girls (season 3) on ETC
 June 13: Goin' Bulilit Classics on Jeepney TV
 June 14: Bora: Sons of the Beach on Jeepney TV
 June 14: News @ 1: The Week That Was on PTV 4
 June 15: Eyeshield 21 (season 2) on Hero
 June 15: Klima ng Pagbabago and Talking Heads on Net 25
 June 16: NCIS (season 9) on Jack City
 June 17: Flames of Desire on TeleAsia Filipino
 June 18: Gintama Enchousen on Hero
 June 18: Covert Affairs (season 4) on Jack City
 June 21: Power Rangers Operation Overdrive on Hero
 June 21: Super Inggo 1.5: Ang Bagong Bangis on Jeepney TV
 June 22: Kuroko's Basketball (season 1) on Hero
 June 26: Arrested Development (season 4) on Jack TV
 June 27: The Legend of Bruce Lee on TeleAsia Filipino
 June 28: Undercover Boss Canada (season 1) on Solar News Channel
 June 28: The Office (season 9) on Fox Channel Philippines
 June 29: Ultraman Mebius on Hero
 June 29: The 100 (season 1) on Jack TV
 June 30: Don't Cry My Love, Giant and Tactics on TeleAsia Filipino
 June 30: Go Diego Go! on S+A
 June 30: The Fashion Fund (season 1) on ETC
 June 30: The Mentalist (season 4) on Jack City
 July 3: Nikita (season 4) on ETC
 July 3: Witches of East End (season 1) on 2nd Avenue
 July 3: A Day in the Life (season 2) on Jack TV
 July 4: The Sisters and Codename: Asero on Fox Filipino
 July 4: House (season 7) on Jack City
 July 4: Meteor Garden II Uncut and Minsan Lang Kita Iibigin  on Jeepney TV
 July 5: Brooklyn Nine-Nine (season 1) on Jack TV
 July 5: Dis Is Pinas on GMA News TV
 July 5: Fringe (season 5) on Jack City
 July 6: It Takes Gutz To Be A Gutierrez (season 1) on E!
 July 10: Beauty & the Beast (season 2) on ETC
 July 11: Andar ng mga Balita on AksyonTV
 July 12: Football Fanatics on IBC 13
 July 12: Sakurano 3 + 1 on TeleAsia Filipino 
 July 12, 13: Balitang 60 on AksyonTV
 July 13: Aksyon Breaking on AksyonTV
 July 13: Prayer for the Holy Souls in Purgatory on PTV 4
 July 14: Touchline: FIFA World Cup Highlights on S+A/Balls
 July 15: 24: Live Another Day on Jack City
 July 15: Back in the Game on 2nd Avenue
 July 17: Chicago P.D. (season 1) on Jack City
 July 18: Klasmeyts on Jeepney TV
 July 21: Bachelor Pad (season 2) on ETC
 July 23: Yatterman (2008) on TeleAsia Filipino
 July 24: Sirens (season 1) on Jack TV
 July 24: Masked Rider Hibiki on TeleAsia Filipino
 July 25: Say Mo, Sec? on PTV 4/IBC 13
 July 25: Ultraman Mebius on S+A
 July 27: Digimon Frontier on Hero
 July 27: Young Minds Inspired (season 2) on GMA News TV
 July 29: Camp and Ready for Love on ETC
 July 30: Donut Showdown (season 1) on 2nd Avenue
 July 31: Dora the Explorer on S+A
 July 31: Trigun on Hero
 July 31: Chicago Fire (season 2) on Jack City
 August 1: Law & Order: Special Victims Unit (season 12) on Jack City
 August 4: Huntahan on UNTV
 August 5: Royal Pains (season 5) on Jack City
 August 5: Time Between Dog and Wolf and Love of the Condor Heroes on TeleAsia Filipino
 August 7: Best Ink (season 2) on Jack TV
 August 7: Basta't Kasama Kita on Jeepney TV
 August 8: Coffee Prince (remake) on TeleAsia Filipino
 August 9: Being Human (season 4) on Jack TV
 August 10: Building Bryks on 2nd Avenue
 August 10: Eyeshield 21 (season 3) on Hero
 August 11: Top Chef (season 11) on 2nd Avenue
 August 11: Salem (season 1) on Jack TV
 August 13: Ground Floor (season 1) on Jack TV
 August 15: My Girl on Jeepney TV
 August 15: Joaquin Bordado on Fox Filipino
 August 16: About a Boy (season 1) on Jack TV
 August 16: Late Show with David Letterman on Solar News Channel
 August 17: Pepeng Agimat on Jeepney TV
 August 19: Shin Mazinger Edition Z on TeleAsia Filipino
 August 20: The Boston: The Kitchen Musical on Lifestyle Network
 August 21: Gang Related on Jack City
 August 22: Power Rangers Samurai on S+A
 August 23: Saturday Night Live (season 39) on Jack TV
 August 24: Knife Fight (season 1) on 2nd Avenue
 August 27: Atashin'chi (season 2) on TeleAsia Filipino
 August 28: Imortal on Jeepney TV
 August 29: Black & White on TeleAsia Filipino
 August 29: Balitaan on PTV 4
 August 29: The Millionare Matchmaker (season 5) on ETC
 August 29: Pep News on Net 25
 August 30: Surviving Jack on Jack TV
 August 30: The Doctor Is In on PTV
 August 30: The Today Show on 9TV
 August 31: Retro TV on IBC 13
 September 1: Legal Help Desk on 9TV
 September 2, 3: America's Got Talent (season 8) on TGC
 September 3: Undateable (season 1) on Jack TV
 September 5: Kung Fu Kids on Jeepney TV
 September 6: Sailor Moon S on Hero
 September 6: Inside Edition on 9TV
 September 7: Tyrant (season 1) on Jack City
 September 7: G-mik on Jeepney TV
 September 9: Gintama (season 4) on Hero
 September 9: Parks and Recreation (season 6) on Jack TV
 September 11: Restaurant Takeover (season 1) on 2nd Avenue
 September 12:  Captain Barbell on Fox Filipino
 September 14: Small Acts, Big Stories on 9TV
 September 15: Merlin (season 5) on Jack TV
 September 15: Knock Out on TeleAsia Filipino
 September 16: Graceland (season 2) on Jack City
 September 16: Wilfred (season 4) on Jack TV
 September 16: Heaven's Dragon on TeleAsia Filipino
 September 17: Parenthood (season 5) on 2nd Avenue
 September 19: Kambal sa Uma on Jeepney TV
 September 19: Likeable or Not and Basketball Tribe on TeleAsia Filipino
 September 19: The Power of Destiny on Telenovela Channel
 September 19: Supa Strikas (reruns) and Spider-Man Unlimited on S+A
 September 21: Top Gear Season 17 on 9TV
 September 22: Yu-Gi-Oh! 5D's (season 2) on Hero
 September 23: Louie (season 3) on Jack TV
 September 24: Thomas and Friends on S+A
 September 24: Kdabra (season 1) on Fox Filipino
 September 24: Kuroko's Basketball (season 2) on Hero
 September 26: Reign (season 1) on ETC
 September 26: Reckless on Jack City
 September 26: The Mindy Project (season 2) on 2nd Avenue
 September 27: Ignite Gospel Music Festival (season 2) on Light Network
 September 28: Elias Paniki on Jeepney TV
 September 28: The Middle (season 5) on 2nd Avenue
 September 29: Project Runway All Stars (season 2) on ETC
 September 30: Digimon Xros Wars on Hero
 September 30: Legit (season 2) and Battleground on Jack TV
 September 30: Metal Fight Beyblade on S+A
 October 2: Kahit Isang Saglit on Jeepney TV
 October 2: Karera Pilipinas (season 1) on SLBN
 October 4: Growing Up Fisher on 2nd Avenue
 October 6, 13: Top Chef (season 10) on TGC
 October 7: Kdabra (season 2) on Fox Filipino
 October 7: Good Wife, Bad Wife on TeleAsia Filipino
 October 8: Chef Roblé & Co. (season 2) on 2nd Avenue
 October 9: Masked Rider 555 on TeleAsia Filipino
 October 9: Witches of East End (season 2) on 2nd Avenue
 October 11: Pasada Sais Trenta Sabado on DZMM TeleRadyo
 October 11: The Strain (season 1) on Jack City
 October 14: How I Met Your Mother (season 1) on Fox Channel Philippines
 October 15: Kdabra (season 3) on Fox Filipino
 October 15: Smash: Covers Project on 2nd Avenue
 October 17: Boys Over Flowers on Jeepney TV
 October 17: Spider-Man and His Amazing Friends on S+A
 October 18: Sean Saves the World on 2nd Avenue
 October 18: Defiance (season 2) on Jack TV
 October 19: Digimon Savers on Hero
 October 19: Etcetera (season 5) on ETC
 October 19: Bakugan Battle Brawlers on TeleAsia Filipino
 October 19: Hitman Reborn! (season 4) on Hero
 October 19: Eat, Drink, Love on 2nd Avenue
 October 20: Detective Loki on Hero
 October 22: Kung Fu Soccer on TeleAsia Filipino
 October 23: K-On! on TeleAsia Filipino
 October 24: Dallas (season 3) on Jack City
 October 24: Ako si Kim Sam Soon and All About Eve (remake) on TeleAsia Filipino
 October 24: Team Umizoomi on S+A
 October 25, November 1: The Bachelorette (season 9) on TGC
 October 25: Barangay Basketball on Net 25
 October 25: Kaya Mo Bang?: The Fudgee Barr Adventures (season 2) on S+A
 October 26: Legends (season 1) on Jack City
 October 26: Doowee Donut Hooper and Drumline Competition (season 1) on S+A
 October 27: Bates Motel (season 2) on Jack TV
 October 28: Fate/kaleid liner Prisma Illya on Hero
 October 30: Fated to Love You on TeleAsia Filipino
 October 31: Naruto Shippuden (season 6) on Hero
 November 1: The Queen Latifah Show (season 1) on 2nd Avenue
 November 2: Power Rangers Samurai on Hero
 November 3: Brickleberry (season 2) on Jack TV
 November 4: Heroman on ABS-CBN Sports+Action
 November 7: Flower I Am on Net 25
 November 7: Enchanted Garden on Fox Filipino
 November 7: My Binondo Girl on Jeepney TV
 November 7: Bubble Guppies on ABS-CBN Sports+Action
 November 13: How I Met Your Mother (season 2) on Fox Channel Philippines
 November 14: Maging Sino Ka Man on Jeepney TV
 November 14: The League (season 4) on TGC
 November 15: A Gentleman's Dignity on Jeepney TV
 November 16: Life of Riley on 2nd Avenue
 November 16: K-On!! on TeleAsia Filipino
 November 19: Gintama (season 5) on Hero
 November 20: Splash U.S. on TGC
 November 20: Nandito Ako on Fox Filipino
 November 21: The Legend on TeleAsia Filipino
 November 23: Animazing Tales on Hero
 November 24: Mistresses UK on 2nd Avenue
 November 24: Majestic Prince on Hero
 November 27: American Dream Builders on 2nd Avenue
 November 27: Love or Bread on Fox Filipino
 November 28: Stylized on ETC
 November 28: Best Ink (season 3) on Jack TV
 November 28: Invincible Shan Bao Mei on TeleAsia Filipino
 November 29: Boys Ride Out (season 1) on 9TV
 December 2: Katorse  on Jeepney TV
 December 5: Pure Love (original) on Jeepney TV
 December 6: Kokey @ Ako and on Jeepney TV
 December 7: Power Rangers Super Samurai on Hero
 December 8: America's Next Top Model (cycle 21) on ETC
 December 8: Initial D: First Stage on Hero
 December 8: Chozen on Jack TV
 December 10: Bakugan: New Vestoria on TeleAsia Filipino
 December 11: How I Met Your Mother (season 3) on Fox Channel Philippines
 December 11: Yakitate! Japan on Hero
 December 11: Cinderella Man on TeleAsia Filipino
 December 12: The Clash: Search for the Next Great Dessert Master on Lifestyle Network
 December 13: I'll Still Love You 10 Years from Now on Jeepney TV
 December 16: Hunter × Hunter (1999) on TeleAsia Filipino
 December 17: The Chair U.S. on TGC
 December 18: Survivor: San Juan del Sur on Jack TV
 December 19: Luna Blanca on Fox Filipino
 December 21: Starlit on TeleAsia Filipino
 December 22: Top Town on TGC
 December 22: Glass Castle on TeleAsia Filipino
 December 23: Going Straight on TGC
 December 23: Heavenly Beauty on TeleAsia Filipino
 December 23: The Unit (season 3) on Fox TV Philippines
 December 25: It Started with a Kiss (season 1) on Fox Filipino
 December 26: Hitman Reborn! (season 4) on S+A
 December 27: Pinay Beauty Queen Academy (season 1) on GMA News TV
 December 29: News+ on S+A
 December 30: Winners & Losers (season 1) on 2nd Avenue
 December 30: Ouran High School Host Club on Hero
 December 31: Home Shopping Network on 9TV
 December 31: Family Rosary Crusade on PTV
}}

Stopped airing
 February 28: Gintama (season 2) on Hero
 June 22: NBA Action on S+A
 June 27: TKO: Tanghali Knockouts on GMA News TV
 August 30: La Teniente on ATC @ IBC 13
 August 31: ATC @ IBC 13 block on IBC 13
 September 26: Sports Desk'' on Solar Sports

Networks
The following is a list of Free-to-Air and Local Cable Networks making noteworthy launches and closures during 2014.

Launches

Rebranded
The following is a list of television stations that have made or will make noteworthy network rebranded in 2014.

Closures

Awards
 January 10: 12th Gawad Tanglaw Awards, organized by Tagapuring mga Akademik ng Aninong Gumagalaw
 February 13: 1st PUP Mabini Media Awards, organized by Polytechnic University of the Philippines (PUP)
 February 20: 10th USTv Students' Choice Awards, organized by University of Santo Tomas (UST)
 March 6: 5th Northwest Samar State University Students' Choice Award for Radio and television, organized by Northwest Samar State University (NSSU)
 March 12: 1st UmalohokJuan Awards, organized by Lyceum of the Philippines-Manila
 March 17: 13th Kabantugan Awards, organized by Mindanao State University (MSU)
 March 21: 2013 Golden Screen TV Awards, organized by the Entertainment Press Society
 April 8: 1st BPSU Kagitingan Awards for Television, organized by Bataan Peninsula State University (BPSU)
 April 29: 22nd KBP Golden Dove Awards, organized by Kapisanan ng mga Brodkaster ng Pilipinas (KBP)
 May 18: 2014 Box Office Entertainment Awards, organized by Guillermo Mendoza Memorial Scholarship Foundation
 May 22: 34th Rotary Club of Manila Journalism Awards, organized by the Rotary Club of Manila
 May 31: 1st Gawad Duyan Media Awards for Local Television, organized by the Philippine Pediatrics Society
 July 18: 2014 Yahoo Celebrity Awards Philippines, organized by Yahoo! Philippines
 August 1: 2014 COMGUILD Awards, part of the 9th Conference of Journalism and Mass Communication Students of the Philippines, held at the AFP Theater, Camp Aguinaldo, Quezon City
 August 17: 4th EdukCircle Awards, held at the UP-Diliman Campus, Quezon City.
 August 20: 2014 VACC Media Awards, organized by the Volunteers Against Crime and Corruption (VACC), held at the NBI Gym, Taft Avenue, Manila.
 September 16: City of Malabon University College of Arts and Sciences Media Awards
 October 29:  36th Catholic Mass Media Awards, organized by the Catholic Mass Media Awards Foundation, held at the GSIS Financial Center Theater, Pasay City
 November 23: 28th PMPC Star Awards for Television organized by Philippine Movie Press Club (PMPC), held at the Solaire Resort and Casino Grand Ballroom, Paranaque City.

Winners
These are awards held in 2014.

Local
This list only includes the Golden Screen TV Awards and Star Awards for Television.

International
This list only includes the International Emmys and the Asian Television Awards.

Deaths
 February 7: Tado Jimenez (born 1974), 39, comedian and host, bus accident.
 February 11: Roy Alvarez (born 1950), 63, actor, cardiac arrest.
 March 10: Roldan Aquino (born 1948), 65, actor, health deterioration after failed recovery from surgery due to stroke.
 April 3: Harry Gasser (born 1938), 76, anchor of RPN NewsWatch, stroke.
 April 30: Ramil Rodriguez (born 1941), 72, actor, lung cancer. 
 May 14: Azucena Vera-Perez, (born 1917), 96, owner of Sampaguita Pictures.
 September 1: Mark Gil, (born 1961), 52, actor, liver cirrosis.
 September 19: Zenaida Sison, 75, Mother of actress Cherry Pie Picache, stab wound.
 October 2: Myrna "Tiya Pusit" Villanueva, (born 1948), 66, Filipina comedian and actress, aortic aneurysm and kidney failure.
 November 5: Elaine Gamboa Cuneta, (born 1934), 79, former beauty queen, singer, and actress, stomach ulcer.
 November 15: Raffy Marcelo (born 1946), 67, anchor of GMA News, cardiac arrest.

See also
2014 in television

References

 
Television in the Philippines by year
Philippine television-related lists